Camugliano is a village in Tuscany, central Italy, administratively a frazione of the comune of Ponsacco, province of Pisa. At the time of the 2006 parish census its population was 40.

Camugliano is about 32 km from Pisa and 2 km from Ponsacco.

References 

Frazioni of the Province of Pisa